Church is a village in Hyndburn, Lancashire, England.  It contains six buildings that are recorded in the National Heritage List for England as designated listed buildings.  Of these, one is listed at Grade II*, the middle grade, and the others are at Grade II.  The Leeds and Liverpool Canal passes through the village, and three of the listed buildings are associated with it; two bridges and a warehouse.  The other listed buildings in the village are a church, a large house, and a war memorial.

Key

Buildings

References

Citations

Sources

Lists of listed buildings in Lancashire
Buildings and structures in Hyndburn